Gypsophila is a genus of flowering plants in the carnation family, Caryophyllaceae. They are native to Eurasia, Africa, Australia, and the Pacific Islands. Turkey has a particularly high diversity of Gypsophila taxa, with about 35 endemic species. Some Gypsophila are introduced species in other regions.

The genus name is from the Greek gypsos ("gypsum") and philios ("loving"), a reference to the gypsum-rich substrates on which some species grow. Plants of the genus are known commonly as baby's-breath, or bebe's breath, a name which also refers specifically to the well known ornamental species Gypsophila paniculata.

Description
Gypsophila is one of the most heterogeneous and largest groups in the carnation tribe, Caryophylleae. The genus comprises approximately 150 species of annual or perennial herbaceous, creeping or cushion-forming plants, inhabiting primarily the mountainous steppes in the north temperate part of the Old World with a diversification hotspot in the Irano-Turanian region. These species also show major variation in inflorescence type ranging from many-flowered lax thyrses or panicles (e.g., G. elegans M.Bieb., G. paniculata L., G. pilosa Huds.) to compact head-like cymes ( G. capitata M.Bieb., G. capituliflora Rupr., G. caricifolia Boiss.), and few-(uni-)flowered raceme-like monochasia (e.g., G. bazorganica Rech.f., G. saponarioides Bornm. & Gauba). Each small flower has a cup-like calyx of white-edged green sepals containing five petals in shades of white or pink. The fruit is a rounded or oval capsule opening at valves. It contains several brown or black seeds which are often shaped like a kidney or a snail shell.

Uses
A few species are commercially cultivated for several uses, including floristry, herbal medicine, and food. The baby's-breath most commonly used in flower arrangements such as bouquets is the common gypsophila, G. paniculata. G. elegans is also used as a cut flower.

The genus is a source of saponins that can be used for many purposes, including the production of photographic film and hemolytic laboratory reagents. Their detergent qualities make them useful in soap and shampoo.

G. rokejeka is used to make the dessert halva. Species are also ingredients in liqueur, cheese, and ice cream, providing flavor, aroma, and crispness to foods.

Several species are hyperaccumulators of boron, and may be planted to absorb the element from polluted soils.

Ecology
Some species are known as weeds, including the "aggressive ornamental" G. paniculata, which invades habitat and competes with native flora.

The plant Çöven, G. simonii is widely distributed throughout Çankırı, where it is a native species, and Turkey. In this study, chemical and physical properties of unripe saponins obtained by extraction from the roots of G. simonii, an endemic plant, were isolated and investigated. Purified aglycones recovered from acid hydrolysis of the saponins were separated by reversed chromatography on a thin layer of silica gel. Phytochemical tests showed the presence of terpenoids in the crude extracts.

Selected species
There are about 150 species in the genus.

Species include:

Gypsophila acantholimoides
Gypsophila achaia
Gypsophila acutifolia – sharpleaf baby's-breath
Gypsophila adenophora
Gypsophila adenophylla
Gypsophila albida
Gypsophila altissima
Gypsophila antari
Gypsophila antoninae
Gypsophila arabica
Gypsophila aretioides
Gypsophila arrostii – Arrost's baby's-breath
Gypsophila aucheri
Gypsophila aulieatensis
Gypsophila australis
Gypsophila bicolor
Gypsophila capituliflora
Gypsophila caricifolia
Gypsophila cephalotes
Gypsophila davurica
Gypsophila desertorum
Gypsophila elegans – showy baby's-breath
Gypsophila fastigiata – fastigiate gypsophila
Gypsophila glandulosa
Gypsophila glomerata
Gypsophila huashanensis
Gypsophila imbricata
Gypsophila intricata
Gypsophila iranica
Gypsophila krascheninnikovii
Gypsophila libanotica
Gypsophila licentiana
Gypsophila litwinowii
Gypsophila nana – dwarf gypsophila
Gypsophila oldhamiana – Manchurian baby's-breath, Oldham's baby's-breath
Gypsophila pacifica
Gypsophila paniculata – baby's-breath, common gypsophila, panicled baby's-breath
Gypsophila patrinii
Gypsophila perfoliata – perfoliate gypsophila
Gypsophila petraea
Gypsophila pilosa – Turkish baby's-breath
Gypsophila repens – alpine gypsophila, creeping baby's-breath
Gypsophila rokejeka 
Gypsophila ruscifolia
Gypsophila scorzonerifolia – glandular baby's-breath, garden baby's-breath
Gypsophila sericea
Gypsophila silenoides
Gypsophila simonii
Gypsophila spergulifolia
Gypsophila spinosa
Gypsophila stevenii – Steven's baby's-breath
Gypsophila struthium
Gypsophila tenuifolia
Gypsophila tschiliensis
Gypsophila uralensis
Gypsophila venusta
Gypsophila viscosa
Gypsophila wendelboi
Gypsophila wilhelminae
Gypsophila xanthochlora

Gypsophila muralis (annual gypsophila, cushion baby's-breath, low baby's-breath) is now placed in the genus Psammophiliella.

References

 
Caryophyllaceae genera
Saponaceous plants